Cosumnes River College station is a side platformed Sacramento RT light rail station in Sacramento, California, United States. The station was opened on August 24, 2015, and is operated by the Sacramento Regional Transit District. It serves as the southern terminus of the Blue Line. The station is located on the east side of Cosumnes River College, near the intersection of Bruceville Road and Cosumnes River Boulevard in South Sacramento. It is attached to a 2,016-stall paid parking garage and is served by several bus routes at a dedicated bus station to the west of the platforms.

References

Sacramento Regional Transit light rail stations
Railway stations in the United States opened in 2015
Railway stations in California at university and college campuses